Oliphant or Olyphant is a surname that was established in England and Scotland by a family of Norman origin. The early forms Olifard and Oliphard (likely "olif" conjoined with the intensive suffix "-ard") are believed to allude to an olive branch. Notable people with the surname include:
Anthony Oliphant (1793–1859), Scottish lawyer and Chief Justice of Ceylon
Betty Oliphant (1918–2004), Canadian dance educator
Charles Oliphant (1666–1719), Scottish physician and politician
David Olyphant (1789–1851), American trader in the Far East
Ernest Henry Clark Oliphant (1862–1936), Australian Elizabethan scholar
Evan Oliphant (born 1982), Scottish cyclist
Francis Wilson Oliphant (1818–1859), British stained glass artist
Greg Oliphant (born 1950), Australian rugby league footballer and coach
James Oliphant (1796–1881), Chairman of H.E.I.C. and Equerry to Maharajah Duleep Singh
John Oliphant (died 1905), Scottish portrait painter
Laurence Oliphant (author) (1829–1888), British author and mystic
Laurence James Oliphant (1846–1914), 9th of Condie and 31st Chief of Clan Oliphant
Laurence Oliphant (Jacobite) (1691–1767), Scottish Jacobite army officer
Laurence Oliphant (Scottish politician) (born 1791), Scottish politician
Margaret Oliphant (1828–1897), Scottish novelist and historical writer
Mark Oliphant (1901–2000), Australian physicist and Governor of South Australia
Mike Oliphant (born 1963), American NFL running back
Pat Oliphant (born 1935), Australian American editorial/political cartoonist
Peter Oliphant, American actor and video game designer
Rob Oliphant (born 1956), Canadian politician
Robert Morrison Olyphant (1824–1918), President of the Delaware and Hudson Railway
Timothy Olyphant (born 1968), American actor
Thomas Oliphant, American journalist
Thomas Oliphant (1799–1873), Scottish musician and artist
William Landon Oliphant (1900–1947), American Protestant preacher and polemicist
William Oliphant, Lord of Aberdalgie (died 1329), Scottish magnate during the Scottish Wars of Independence
William Oliphant (governor of Stirling Castle) (died after 1313), Governor of Stirling Castle during the Scottish Wars of Independence
Oliphant brothers, Nigel and Harry Oliphant, manufacturers of ultraviolet lamps in South Australia

See also
 Justice Oliphant (disambiguation)
 Oliphant (disambiguation)

References